Surely You Joust was Ray Stevens' twenty-third studio album and his third for MCA Records. The album's front cover shows Stevens disguised as a medieval knight with a horse standing next to him. The album's back cover shows Stevens in the same costume but in a junk pile with two junk men. Three singles were lifted from the album: "Southern Air" (featuring Jerry Clower and Minnie Pearl), "People's Court", and "Can He Love You Half as Much as I", the last of which did not chart.

Track listing

Album credits 
Per liner notes.
 Ray Stevens – producer, arrangements, art direction 
 Stuart Keathley – engineer
 Ray Stevens Studio (Nashville, Tennessee) – recording location 
 Glenn Meadows – mastering at Masterfonics (Nashville, Tennessee)
 Susan Lawson – production coordinator 
 Slick Lawson – art direction, photography
 Barnes & Company – design 
 Camille Engel Advertising – CD design

Musicians
 Ray Stevens – vocals, backing vocals, keyboards, synthesizers, trumpet
 Shane Keister – vocoder programming
 Mark Casstevens – rhythm guitars, banjo
 Steve Gibson – electric guitars, dobro, mandolin
 Jack Williams – bass guitar
 Jerry Kroon – drums
 Johnny Gimble – fiddle
 Denis Solee – saxophones
 Norro Wilson – armpit sounds
 Lisa Silver – backing vocals 
 Wendy Suits – backing vocals 
 Diane Tidwell – backing vocals

Chart performance

Album

Singles

References

1986 albums
MCA Records albums
Ray Stevens albums